Mahankal may refer to: 

Mahankal, Kathmandu, Nepal
Mahankal, Sindhupalchok, Nepal